Mirson Volina (born 8 January 1990) is an Albanian footballer who plays for FC Breitenrain Bern in the Swiss Promotion League.

Club career
Volina spent two seasons in Germany, with  SC Pfullendorf and Spfr Siegen.

References

External links
Mirson Volina profile at football.ch

 German career stats - FuPa

1990 births
Living people
Association football midfielders
Macedonian footballers
Albanian footballers
Albania under-21 international footballers
FC Thun players
FC Biel-Bienne players
FC Köniz players
SC Pfullendorf players
Sportfreunde Siegen players
Breitenrain Bern players
Swiss Super League players
Swiss Challenge League players
Swiss Promotion League players
Macedonian expatriate footballers
Albanian expatriate footballers
Expatriate footballers in Switzerland
Macedonian expatriate sportspeople in Switzerland
Albanian expatriate sportspeople in Switzerland
Expatriate footballers in Germany
Macedonian expatriate sportspeople in Germany
Albanian expatriate sportspeople in Germany